John Alfred Kjellstrom (February 28, 1923 – October 19, 2015) was a lieutenant general in the United States Army.

Early life and education
Kjellstrom was born in Rockford, Illinois and brought up in Hebron, Illinois where he played basketball and was part of the Hebron team which reached the state tournament for the first time (Hebron went on to win it in 1952). He enlisted in the Army in December 1942 and was commissioned in June 1944. Kjellstrom later studied at the University of Maryland and completed a Bachelor of Science degree in 1956. He went on to gain a Master of Science degree in international affairs at George Washington University in 1965. Kjellstrom graduated from Air University in 1950, the Naval War College in 1957 and the Army War College in 1965.

Military career
In World War II, Kjellstrom was a platoon leader with the 76th Infantry Division. During the Korean War, he was a Staff Officer with Logistical Command in Japan. He commanded the 14th Inventory Control Center during the Vietnam War. He went on to serve as Director of the Budget of the U.S. Army and as Comptroller of the Army, retiring in 1977.

Later life
After retirement Kjellstrom and his wife Dorothy (Ellis) Kjellstrom (November 2, 1921 – October 28, 2006) moved to Jekyll Island, Georgia, then to Melbourne, Florida before finally settling in Palm City. Kjellstrom was interred next to his wife at Arlington National Cemetery on July 18, 2016.

References

1923 births
2015 deaths
People from Rockford, Illinois
People from Hebron, Illinois
United States Army soldiers
Military personnel from Illinois
United States Army personnel of World War II
University System of Maryland alumni
Elliott School of International Affairs alumni
United States Army personnel of the Vietnam War
Recipients of the Legion of Merit
United States Army generals
Recipients of the Distinguished Service Medal (US Army)
People from Glynn County, Georgia
People from Melbourne, Florida
People from Palm City, Florida
Burials at Arlington National Cemetery